Tilia tuan is a species of flowering plant found in forests at elevations of 1200–2400 m in the central Chinese provinces of Guangxi, Guizhou, Hubei, Hunan, Jiangsu, Jiangsu, Jiangxi, Sichuan, Yunnan, and Zhejiang. The species has long been regarded as the most variable lime within China, acquiring numerous synonyms; three varieties are currently recognized.
 The tree was first described by Henry who discovered it in 1888.

Description
Tilia tuan is a deciduous tree reaching 10–20 m in height, its bark grey and longitudinally exfoliate; the branches are glabrous or tomentose, and form an open crown. The leaves are paper-thin, narrowly ovate or ovate-oblong to ovate-orbicular, 6.5–17 × 3.5–11 cm, on 1–6 cm petioles, the base oblique, rounded, truncate, or cordate, the margin can be entire or with minute teeth, or prominently dentate, the apex acuminate or acute. The upper surface is nearly all glabrous, the lower covered with a close grey felt. The violet-scented inflorescences appearing in late summer are cymes comprising 3–22 flowers 5–14 cm long, the petals 6–8 mm. The fruits are globose to obovoid-globose, 7–11 × 7–9mm, hard, and brown or grey hairy, and ripen between July and November. Ploidy: N = 82.

Cultivation
The species and the variety Chinensis are believed to have been introduced to the UK by Wilson while collecting for Veitch, though there is no record of their subsequent distribution.

Notable trees
Probably the largest specimens surviving in the UK are at Thorp Perrow Arboretum, Yorkshire, planted 1936 and measuring 21 m × 0.7 m d.b.h. in 2004, and at Borde Hill, Surrey; the latter bought at the Aldenham sale of 1932 as var. Chinensis, which measured 20 m × 1 m d.b.h. in 1984.

Varieties
Three varieties are recognized, var. Tuan, var. Chinensis, and var. Chenmoui, distinguished by minor differences in the inflorescences or leaf margins.

Accessions

Europe
Borde Hill Arboretum, Surrey, UK. Acc. no. not known. Planted 1932. 
Sir Harold Hillier Gardens, Hampshire, UK. acc. nos. 1983.1908, provenance unknown; 2002.0615, wild collected, Yunnan, China. 
Thorp Perrow Arboretum, Yorkshire, UK. Acc. no. not known. Planted 1936.
Ventnor Botanic Garden, Isle of Wight, UK. As Tilia chenmoui. Acc. details not known.

References

Further reading
Rehder, A. & Wilson, E. H. (1915). in Sargent (Ed.), Plantae Wilsonianae 2,  p. 368. 1915
Pigott, D. (2002). Edinburgh J. Bot. 59, 239–246. 2002

tuan
Trees of China